Swainsona procumbens  (common names - Broughton pea, swamp pea) is a plant in the pea family (Fabaceae) native to Australia and found in New South Wales, Victoria, Queensland and South Australia.

Description 
Swainsona procumbens is a spreading or ascending perennial with smooth or sparsely hair stems growing up to 50 cm high. The leaves are from 5 to 15 cm long, and pinnate with from 15 to 25 leaflets which have apices which are either notched or obtuse, and are  5–25 mm by 1–5 mm. The leaflet surfaces are without a covering or their lower surfaces may be densely covered in weak hairs. The leaves have stipules which are often toothed and from 2 to 7 mm long. The inflorescences are 2-12 flowered racemes, with flowers from 10–20 mm long. The corolla is mostly purple, and the apex of the keel coils into a complete circle. The style tip is inflexed.  The pod is narrow and from 20 mm to 40 mm long and sometimes hairy.

Habitat 
It is found on heavy, frequently water logged soils.

Taxonomy
It was first described as Cyclogyne procumbens by Ferdinand von Mueller in 1853, but in 1859, Mueller reassigned it to the genus, ''Swainsona.

References

External links
''Swainsona procumbens occurrence data from Australasian Virtual Herbarium

procumbens
Fabales of Australia
Flora of New South Wales
Flora of Victoria (Australia)
Flora of South Australia
Flora of Queensland
Plants described in 1853
Taxa named by Ferdinand von Mueller